Ramón Carnero González (born 8 November 1953) is a Spanish retired footballer who played as a defender, and later worked as a manager.

Playing career

Carnero was born in Vigo in the province of Pontevedra, within the autonomous community of Galicia, and played for local minnows Gran Peña Celtista. He spent 18 months at Deportivo Alavés from the summer of 1977, making only one appearance in the Segunda División. He played the last nine minutes of an away fixture against Real Zaragoza on 23 April 1978, replacing Luis Sánchez Martín as Alavés lost 1–0. After half a season with Logroñés in Segunda División B, he joined Arosa in the Tercera División in 1979. He spent five years there, returning to the third tier for his last season after promotion in 1983.

Coaching career

Carnero was the manager of Celta Vigo's B team, Celta Turista, for the 1992–93 Segunda División season. They avoided relegation in 15th place, but Carnero was replaced by Jacinto Barreiro the following season.

When Celta first team coach Miguel Ángel Lotina was sacked in January 2004, Carnero stepped in as caretaker manager. His sole match in charge was a 1–0 win over his former club Deportivo Alavés in the quarter-finals of the Copa del Rey, although Celta were still eliminated 4–3 on aggregate. Radomir Antić was appointed as the new manager the following day.

Antić lasted only two months before quitting in March, and Carnero once again stepped into the breach, taking charge until the end of the season. He could not prevent Celta being relegated, and was replaced by Fernando Vázquez the following season.

Career statistics

Player

As a manager

References

External links

1953 births
Living people
Spanish footballers
Footballers from Vigo
Association football defenders
Segunda División players
Segunda División B players
Tercera División players
Deportivo Alavés players
CD Logroñés footballers
Spanish football managers
La Liga managers
Segunda División B managers
RC Celta de Vigo managers